Long Scraggy Peak is a mountain in Jefferson County, Colorado. A prominent peak, it is characterized by its elongated, craggy ridge, for which it is named. The mountain is located within the Pike National Forest near the confluence of the North Fork South Platte River and the South Platte River. 

The peak, elevation , is popular among mountain climbers, day hikers, and rock climbers, especially in winter, as the peak's relatively low elevation means there's often less snow than on higher peaks.

Geology
The peak is made up of Pikes Peak granite.

References

Mountains of Jefferson County, Colorado
North American 2000 m summits